The 2015 FXFL season was the second season of the Fall Experimental Football League (FXFL) and the final season of league play before it was replaced by The Spring League in 2017.

Relocations and franchise changes
The Boston Brawlers ceased operations. The team had originally announced it was relocating the team to Eastwood Field in Niles, Ohio to become the "Mahoning Valley Brawlers" but had its franchise revoked one week before the start of play.
The Omaha Mammoths ceased operations and were replaced by the Hudson Valley Fort, who will play at Dutchess Stadium in Fishkill, New York.

With the Brawlers' sudden contraction, the league shrunk from four teams to three, with the Brooklyn Bolts and traveling Florida Blacktips remaining as they were in 2014. The league's geographic footprint also shrunk so that both teams with home fields are located in the state of New York.

Coaching changes
In Brooklyn, John Bock left the team. Replacing Bock was Terry Shea, who moved over from the same position with the Brawlers.
Hudson Valley hired John Jenkins, who had previously served as coach of the Blacktips and the Ottawa Renegades of the CFL, as their head coach. Sandy Buda, who had coached the predecessor Omaha Mammoths, declined to leave Omaha. The Blacktips never announced who their head coach was for the 2015 season. Jenkins himself would quit the league midseason after not being paid, with Robert Gordon serving as the Fort's head coach for the remainder of the season.
The Brawlers had planned to hire Rick Worman, most recently offensive coordinator for the Montreal Alouettes, as head coach before the team was contracted.

Regular season

The second Blacktips/Bolts game was originally scheduled for Friday, October 30th, but the game was rescheduled to one day earlier due to Game 3 the 2015 World Series, which was to be hosted by the Bolts' parent company, the New York Mets.

As was the case in the 2014 season, the last game of the season (the only matchup between the Blacktips and Hudson Valley) was canceled, and no championship was played.Friday's HV Fort Game CANCELLED!. Hudson valley Renegades. Retrieved November 6, 2015. As a result, because the Blacktips and Hudson Valley never faced each other, it became impossible to determine a true champion; although Brooklyn technically had the better record, the Blacktips and Bolts split the two-game series between each other 1–1 and the three games' difference between them and the Blacktips was all in games against winless Hudson Valley, whom the Blacktips never got to face.

Schedule

Final standings

References

FXFL
Fall Experimental Football League seasons